The floor (or floor exercise) is an artistic gymnastics event held at the Summer Olympics. The event was first held for men at the 1932 Olympic Games.  For women it was first held in 1952.

Medalists

Men

Multiple medalists

Medalists by country

Women

Multiple medalists

Medalists by country

Gallery

References 

Floor